Endemann is a surname. Notable people with the surname include:

 Alicia Endemann (born 1988), German actress, beauty queen, and model
 Gernot Endemann (1942–2020), German film and television actor
 Wilhelm Endemann (1825–1899), German jurist
 Till Endemann, director of Vater Morgana